Ivan Aleksandrovich Vyrypaev (born August 3, 1974) is a Polish, Russian-born playwright, screenwriter, film director, actor and art director. He is a leading figure in the Russian New Drama movement.

Biography
Father - Aleksandr Nikolayevich Vyrypaev, teacher of the Irkutsk Pedagogical College No. 1, was awarded the Patriot of Russia commemorative medal. Mother - Vera Timofeyevna Vyrypaeva, had higher trade education, died tragically.

In 1995, Ivan graduated from the Irkutsk Theater School, after graduation he worked for one season as an actor in the Magadan Theater, then for two seasons as an actor in the Drama and Comedy Theater in Kamchatka.

In 1998, founded the theater-studio "Space of the Game" in Irkutsk. In the same year, Ivan became a student at the Higher Theater School named after Shchukin, studying at the departments of "Drama Theater Director".

In 1999–2001, Vyrypaev taught acting skills at the Irkutsk Theater School, on the course of Vyacheslav Kokorin.

In 2005, he created the Kislorod Movement agency for creative projects in the field of cinema, theater and literature.

In 2006, he worked as the art director of the Praktika Theatre.

In April 2013, he assumed the position of artistic director of the Praktika Theatre. In May 2016, he left this position.

Since 2020, he has been the general producer of the Okko Theater bureau, which is busy producing and filming performances for shows on the Okko platform. In the spring of 2021, he left this position.

Vyrypaev gained fame in Europe primarily as a theatrical playwright. By 2019, his plays have already been staged in more than 250 theaters around the world. So Vyrypaev entered the top 10 most prominent playwrights in the world. He is also known as a film director, his film Euphoria got into the main competition of the Venice Film Festival and received the award of the "youth jury" "small golden lion" for the best film. He taught at GITIS, at the Moscow Art Theater School, the Warsaw Academy of Theater Arts.

In May 2022 he became a Polish citizen and gave up his Russian citizenship.

Family
  First wife - actress Svetlana Ivanova-Sergeyeva. Son Gennady (born 1994).
  Second wife (2003-2007) - actress Polina Agureeva. Son Peter (b. October 26, 2004).
  The third wife is the Polish actress Karolina Gruszka. Daughter (b. 2012).

Filmography

Actor
2002 - Killer's Diary - Ivan Azovsky
2006 - Bunker, or Underground Scientists - Guidon
2006 - Boomer. The second film - a bum in a cafe
2015 - Salvation - photographer

Film director
2006 - Euphoria
2009 - Oxygen
2009 - Feel (movie almanac "Short Circuit")
2012 - Delhi Dance
2015 - Salvation
2020 - Entertainment
2020 - UFO
2021 - World of beautiful butterflies
2021 – Research Study. New Constructive Ethics

Screenplays
2002 — Money
2006 — Boomer. The second film
2006 — Bunker, or Scientists Underground
2006 — Euphoria
2007 — Antonina Turned Back
2007 — The Best Time of the Year
2009 — Oxygen
2009 — Short circuit
2010 — Pure light
2012 — Delhi Dance
2015 — Salvation
2020 — UFO
2020 — Entertainment
2021 — World of beautiful butterflies
2021 — Research Study. New Constructive Ethics

Producer
  2020 — UFO
  2020 — Entertainment
  2021 — World of beautiful butterflies

Theatre director
 Yu (original title, Irkutsk)
  Dreams (Irkutsk, Moscow)
  Macbeth (Irkutsk)
  The City Where I Am (Irkutsk)
  To Explain (Moscow Theatre School of Dramatic Art)
  Delhi Dance (National Theatre, Warsaw)
  July (National Theatre, Warsaw)
  Comedy (Praktika Theatre)
  Illusions (Praktika Theatre)
  Illusions (Stary Teatr, Kraków)
  Unbearably long embraces (Praktika Theatre)
  Illusions (Stary Teatr, Kraków)
  Marriage (Studio Theatre, Warsaw)
  Interview S-FBP 4408 (Bolshaya Dmitrovka, Moscow)
   Illusiones (El Pavón Teatro Kamikaze, Madrid). Directed by Miguel del Arco with Marta Etura, Daniel Grao, Alejandro Jato and Verónica Ronda.
   Boris Godunov (Bolshoi Theatre, Poznan)
   Diary of Zherebtsova Polina (Museum of the Uprising, Warsaw)
   Uncle Vanya (Polish Theater named after Arnold Shifman, Warsaw)
   2019 - Disquet (Bolshoi Drama Theater named after G. A. Tovstonogov, Saint Petersburg)
   2021 - 1.8 M (New Theatre, Warsaw)

Plays
  1999 — Dreams
  2000 — The City Where I Am
  2001 — Valentine's Day
  2001 — Karaoke box
  2002 — Oxygen
  2004 — Being No.2
  2006 — July
  2008 — To Explain
  2010 — Delhi Dance
  2010 — Comedy
  2011 — Illusions 
  2011 — DREAMWORKS
  2012 — Summer bees sting in November, too
  2012 — Drunks
  2012 — UFO
  2013 — Shugar
  2014 — What I learned from the snake
  2014 — Unbearably long embraces
  2015 — Line of the sun
  2016 — Interview S-FBP 4408
  2017 — Iranian Conference
  2018 — Nancy
  2019 — Disquiet 
  2020 — Entertainment
  2021 — Research Study. New Constructive Ethics
  2021 — World of beautiful butterflies

References

External links
 
 Official Website
 Facebook page

1974 births
Living people
21st-century Russian dramatists and playwrights
21st-century Russian male actors
21st-century Russian screenwriters
Male screenwriters
Actors from Irkutsk
Recipients of the Nika Award
Russian dramatists and playwrights
Russian film directors
Russian male film actors
Russian male stage actors
Russian theatre directors
Russian activists against the 2022 Russian invasion of Ukraine
Writers from Irkutsk